Phil Alden Robinson (born March 1, 1950) is an American film director and screenwriter whose films include Field of Dreams, Sneakers, and The Sum of All Fears.

Early life and education
Robinson was born in Long Beach, New York, the son of Jessie Frances and S. Jesse Robinson, who was a drama critic for the New York Journal American and a media coordinator for the liquor division of the National Distillers & Chemical Corp. in New York. Robinson graduated from Union College in Schenectady, New York, with a Bachelor of Arts degree in political science and received an Honorary Doctorate of Letters from Union College in 1996.

Career
Robinson directed the baseball film Field of Dreams (1989). It earned Robinson nominations for the Directors Guild of America Award, the Writers Guild of America Award, and an Oscar for Best Screenplay Adaptation (the film was also nominated for Best Picture and Best Original Score Oscars). Other accolades for the film include the Christopher Award, and Premiere Magazine's Readers Poll for Best Picture of 1989.

His next feature, Sneakers (1992), was nominated for an Edgar Award by the Mystery Writers of America.

Robinson's 2000 TV drama Freedom Song won the Writers Guild of America Award for Best Original Longform Screenplay, was nominated for two Emmy Awards, three NAACP Image Awards (including Best TV Movie), a Screen Actors Guild Award, a Sound Editors Golden Reel Award, and the Humanitas Prize. It also received the Christopher Award, the San Francisco Film Society's "Golden Gate Award", and a National Association of Minorities in Communications Image Award.

For Band of Brothers (2001), he (along with all the directors on the series) was nominated for a Directors Guild of America Award and won an Emmy Award for Best Directing of a Miniseries, Movie or Dramatic Special.

In 1990, Robinson was named "Screenwriter of the Year" by the National Association of Theatre Owners, and in 1994 received the Writers Guild of America's Valentine Davies Award for contributions to the entertainment industry and the community-at-large.

In 1992, he accompanied the United Nations High Commission for Refugees as an observer on relief missions to Somalia and Bosnia, for which he wrote and directed his first of five documentaries for ABC News Nightline. The last one, Sarajevo Spring, was nominated for a national News & Documentary Emmy Award in 1997.

Robinson is currently Vice President of the Academy of Motion Picture Arts and Sciences, is a past member of the board of directors of the Writers Guild of America, and serves on the Board of Overseers of the UCLA Hammer Museum.

Filmography

Screenplays 
Rhinestone (with Sylvester Stallone) (1984)
All of Me (1984)
Relentless (as Jack T.D. Robinson) (1989)
Ghost Dad (as Chris Reese, with Brent Maddock and S. S. Wilson) (1990)
The Chamber (as Chris Reese, with William Goldman) (1996)
Juliet, Naked (with Tamara Jenkins, Jim Taylor and Evgenia Peretz) (2018)
Robinson also worked as a script doctor on the 1985 film Fletch, uncredited.

Television

As creator 

 The Good Fight (2017–2022)

As contributor 

 Trapper John M.D. (1981) (writer, 2 episodes)
 Band of Brothers (2001) (director, 1 episode)
 The Good Wife (2016) (director, 1 episode)

Awards and nominations

References

External links

1950 births
Living people
People from Long Beach, New York
American male screenwriters
Union College (New York) alumni
Primetime Emmy Award winners
Film directors from New York (state)
Screenwriters from New York (state)